Vali Mohammad (also Romanized as Valī Moḩammad; also known as Dalī Moḩammad and Dil-i-Muhammad) is a village in Kuhin Rural District, in the Central District of Kabudarahang County, Hamadan Province, Iran. At the 2006 census, its population was 563, in 111 families.

References 

Populated places in Kabudarahang County